FLORE (born 1963) is a French-Spanish photographer and daughter of the painter Olga Gimeno.

Work
FLORE took up photography in 1977 and after completing her studies in Toulouse, she established herself in Paris where she currently lives and works.

Laureate 2018 of the Prix de Photographie of the Academie des Beaux—Arts - Marc Ladreit de Lacharrière, her work is realized on the long course, often during travels, and are acquired and presented in various prestigious institutions such as the Petit Palais Museum, the BNF, the MMP + of Marrakech, the Memorial of Rivesaltes, as well as on the occasion of Art Fair throughout the world.
Alongside her photographic work, FLORE is an acclaimed teacher running regular masterclass.

FLORE defines her poetic and timeless universe as a political act and this is her way to position themselves in front of "the beam of darkness that comes from his own time" as Giorgio Agamben says. She uses mainly analog photography and alternative process, sometimes with additions of material like wax, gold or watercolor with particular care for the print.

Gallery representatives
 Galerie Clémentine de la Féronnière - Paris
 Galerie 127 - Marrakech
 Galeria Blanca Berlin - Madrid
 Galerie Wada-Garou - Tokyo

Collections
 Petit Palais, Musée des Beaux-Arts de la Ville de Paris  
 Bibliothèque Nationale de France 
 The Marrakech Museum for Photography and Visual Arts 
 Mémorial du Camp de Concentration de Rivesaltes  
 Galerie du Château d'Eau de Toulouse  
 Collection Hubert de Wangen   
 Collection Ely-Michel Ruimy  
 Privates collections, in Europe, Morocco, États-Unis and Japan.

Books 
 2009 : Je me souviens de vous, Éditions L'Œil de l'Esprit
 2010 : Catalogue épuisé / Une femme française en Orient, Livre+DVD de Adrian Claret-Pérez, Éditions L'Œil de l'Esprit
 2014 : Une femme française en Orient, texte de Natacha Wolinski, Éditions Postcart • 
 2016 : Lointains souvenirs, écrit de Marguerite Duras & préface de Laure Adler, Éditions Contrejour & Postcart •  
 2018 : Camp de Rivesaltes, lieu de souffrance, texte de Denis Peschanski, André Frère éditions • 
 2019 : Maroc, un temps suspendu, Écrits de Anais Nin, Edith wharton, Nedjma, Colette, Nicole de Pontcharra . Préface de Frédéric Miterrand,  Éditions Contrejour & Postcart • 
 2020 : L'Odeur de la nuit était celle du jasmin, écrit de Marguerite Duras, Maison CF  •

References 

  L'Egypte de FLORE / Documentary about Flore.

External links 
 
  Intime public, official Blog
  L'Oeil de l'Esprit, Atelier Photographique directed by FLORE.

French photographers
1963 births
Living people
French women photographers